Abexinostat (INN, formerly PCI-24781) is an experimental drug candidate for cancer treatment.  It was developed by Pharmacyclics and licensed to Xynomic. and is in Phase II clinical trials for B-cell lymphoma.  Pre-clinical study suggests the potential for treatment of different types of cancer as well.

Abexinostat exerts its effect as a pan-histone deacetylase inhibitor and inhibits RAD51, which is involved in repairing DNA double strand breaks.

References

Benzofuran-2-carboxamides
Hydroxamic acids
Histone deacetylase inhibitors
Antineoplastic drugs
Experimental cancer drugs
Benzamides
2-Phenoxyethanamines